Hala Al-Dosari is a Saudi women's activist. She was awarded the Alison Des Forges Award for Extraordinary Activism by Human Rights Watch in 2018.

References

Living people
Year of birth missing (living people)
Hala
Saudi Arabian women's rights activists
Women activists